Salinas is a town and municipality in the southern part of Puerto Rico located in the southern coast of the island, south of Aibonito and Cayey; southeast of Coamo, east of Santa Isabel; and west of Guayama. Salinas is spread over 5 barrios and Salinas Pueblo (the downtown area and the administrative center of the city).

It has long been a fishing spot for Puerto Ricans, known for its beaches, fish variety and the birthplace of the famous "mojo isleño".

Although Salinas doesn't have any commercial airports, there is a military training area there, Camp Santiago, which is one of the training centers of the Puerto Rico National Guard. Army National Guard, Air National Guard, State Guard, U.S. Army ROTC, U.S. Army Reserve and the U.S. Army also conduct military training at Camp Santiago.

History
Salinas was founded in 1840. On July 22, 1841, its first municipal council was established by Don Agustín Colón Pacheco as Mayor, Don Jose Maria Cadavedo as Sargent of Arms, Don Juan Colon as Captain of the Civil Guard and five hacendados which were Don Antonio Semidey, Don Antonio Morelli, Don Francisco Secola, Don Julio Delannoy and Don Jose Antonio Torres. In 1847 it was annexed to the municipality of Guayama until 1851 when it regained its status as a municipality.

Puerto Rico was ceded by Spain in the aftermath of the Spanish–American War under the terms of the Treaty of Paris of 1898 and became a territory of the United States. In 1899, the United States conducted its first census of Puerto Rico finding that the population of Salinas was 5,731

In the 21st century the availability of clean drinking water has become an issue for Puerto Rico and especially for Salinas which is located in a dry region of the island.

On September 20, 2017 Hurricane Maria struck the island of Puerto Rico. In Salinas, 2800 homes were destroyed by the winds, flooded rivers, and ocean surge.

During Hurricane Fiona on September 18, 2022, flood waters from 30 inches of rain caused the river to flood neighborhoods and destroy homes in Salinas.

Geography

Salinas is on the southern coast.
Gorges: The Callao, La Palma y Majada and Pasto Viejo.
Lagoons: Mar Negro and Punta Arctias.
Rivers: Río Jájome, Río Jueyes, Río Lapa and Río Nigua (Río Salinas).
Mountains: Cerro Las Tetas, Montes Oscuros

Barrios
Like all municipalities of Puerto Rico, Salinas is subdivided into barrios.
Aguirre 
Lapa 
Palmas
Quebrada Yeguas
Río Jueyes
Salinas barrio-pueblo

Sectors
Barrios (which are like minor civil divisions) and subbarrios, in turn, are further subdivided into smaller local populated place areas/units called sectores (sectors in English). The types of sectores may vary, from normally sector to urbanización to reparto to barriada to residencial, among others.

Special Communities

 (Special Communities of Puerto Rico) are marginalized communities whose citizens are experiencing a certain amount of social exclusion. A map shows these communities occur in nearly every municipality of the commonwealth. Of the 742 places that were on the list in 2014, the following barrios, communities, sectors, or neighborhoods were in Salinas: Las Mareas, Playita, el Coco, Comunidad Aguirre, El Coquí, Parcelas Vázquez, San Felipe, Sector Borinquén, and Sector Villa Cofresí.

Economy

Agriculture

Salinas is one of the main agricultural producers on the southern coast of Puerto Rico. It has large banana and papaya farms in its Lapa and Aguirre barrios. The Río Jueyes barrio is one of the main producers of beef in the south, counting with La Hacienda Las Carolinas which supplies Ganaderia Santiago, a slaughter house, with meat. Salinas also is headquarters for Canto Alegre, a company which specializes in poultry. This company supplies most of Puerto Rico's supermarkets with fresh poultry.

Business
Apparel
Commercial fishing: Salinas has a private marina with a hotel and convention center.

Industry
The Aguirre Sugar Cane Mill was the last operational sugarcane mill in Puerto Rico and closed its doors in 1993. The Central Aguirre Historic District is listed on the National Register of Historic places but there are no current plans to renovate the area and is now mostly in ruins. 
Some other industries in Salinas include electrical and electronic machinery, plastics, sunglasses.

Tourism

Landmarks and places of interest
There are 17 beaches in Salinas.
Some of Salina's main attractions are:
Albergue Olímpico (Olympic Hostel), is a sports complex and hostel with air-conditioned rooms.
Antigua Central Aguirre (Sugar Cane Mill)
Camp Santiago
Montes Oscuros
Monumento al Jíbaro
Salinas Sports Museum
Playa Salinas

Culture

Festivals and events
Salinas celebrates its patron saint festival in September. The  is a religious and cultural celebration that generally features parades, games, artisans, amusement rides, regional food, and live entertainment.

Other festivals and events celebrated in Salinas include:
 Abey Carnival – February to celebrate Abey – Cacique (Chief) of Yucayeque, a former Taino village in the area of Abeyno, Salinas
  – June

Demographics

Government

All municipalities in Puerto Rico are administered by a mayor, elected every four years. Karilyn Bonilla Colón (of the Popular Democratic Party) was elected as mayor at the 2012 general election, succeeding Carlos Rodríguez Mateo.

The city belongs to the Puerto Rico Senatorial district VI, which is represented by two senators. In 2012, Miguel Pereira Castillo and Angel M. Rodríguez were elected as district senators.

Transportation 
There are 41 bridges in Salinas.

Symbols
The  has an official flag and coat of arms.

Flag
On a green rectangular field, five white isosceles triangles equal in size, placed in the center of the flag and forming a row that covers the extent of the background. The green represents the land and the triangles hills of salt from which the name of the town is derived.

Coat of arms
The shield uses the traditional colors of the town; green and silver. 
The salt knolls indicate in graphical form the name of the town: Salinas. The fish refer to the fishing. The sugar cane leaves that surround the shield, symbolize the sugar cane plantations.

Notable people 
 Zuleyka Rivera - Miss Universe 2006 
 Angel "Cholo" Espada - former World Boxing Association (WBA) welterweight champion of the world
 Jay Wheeler - reggaeton singer

Gallery

See also

List of Puerto Ricans
History of Puerto Rico
Did you know-Puerto Rico?

References

Further reading

External links 
 Puerto Rico Government Directory – Salinas

 
Municipalities of Puerto Rico
Populated coastal places in Puerto Rico
Populated places established in 1841
1841 establishments in the Spanish Empire